WTBS-LD, virtual and VHF digital channel 6, is a low-powered television station licensed to Atlanta, Georgia, United States. The station has been owned by Prism Broadcasting since 1991. The station's transmitter and antenna are located in downtown Atlanta atop the American Tower Site located at 315 Chester Avenue, Atlanta.

The original WTBS-LD, virtual channel 26 (UHF digital channel 30), was a low-powered Estrella TV-affiliated television station also licensed to Atlanta. The station, which broadcast six subchannels, was a digital satellite of the current WTBS-LD, then known as WTBS-LP.

The digital transmitter, which signed on in early January 2011, was, with its sister station WANN-CD, located just northeast of the city on one of the two large towers on Briarcliff Road, at the same site along with Independent station WPCH-TV (channel 17), Univision affiliate WUVG-DT (channel 34), CBS affiliate WANF (channel 46), TBN affiliate WHSG-TV (channel 63), and several other stations.

The original WTBS-LD's license was cancelled by the Federal Communications Commission on March 17, 2021.

History
The station signed on as W56CD in Rome, Georgia; then W26BT; WANX-LP in January 2000; and WTBS-LP on October 15, 2007. The WANX call letters were formerly used by CBS affiliate WANF.

In 2014, the analog WTBS-LP reappeared under special temporary authority on TV channel 6, which can also be received on 87.75 MHz of the FM dial. All analog television channels had been scheduled to cease broadcasting in September 2015; this was suspended by the FCC in April of that year. In 2017, it was announced that July 13, 2021 would be the new analog low-power television transmission shutoff date. Analog channel 6 later broadcast an urban AC format branded as "Mix 87.7", which is also heard via stereo audio on 87.75 FM. Steve Hegwood, the operator of Mix 87.7 announced it would cease using the WTBS frequency on January 31, 2019 due to financial shortfalls and an overcompetitive market for radio targeted at Atlanta's black community.
As of February 1, 2019, WTBS-LP became a Regional Mexican station called "La Invasora."

WTBS-LP was licensed for digital operation on July 14, 2021, and changed its call sign to WTBS-LD. On July 16, the station received special temporary authority from the FCC to provide an ancillary audio signal at 87.7 FM.

Digital channels
The station's digital signal is multiplexed:

References

Estrella TV affiliates
TBS-LD
Television channels and stations established in 1988
TBS-LD
Low-power television stations in the United States
ATSC 3.0 television stations